The Breguet 27 was a 1930s French biplane military reconnaissance aircraft, built for the Armée de l'Air (French Air Force) and for export to Venezuela and China.

Design and development
The Bréguet 27 was designed in response to a 1928 request for proposals by the Armée de l'Air for a two-seat observation aircraft to replace the Bréguet 19. Bréguet submitted a large all-metal sesquiplane with an unusual fuselage that ended abruptly, aft of the two open cockpits. The empennage was mounted on a boom behind the fuselage. Construction was largely of steel tubing with non-structural aluminium alloy sheeting and fabric covering for wings and empennage.

The prototype exhibited mediocre performance during flight trials. Nonetheless the military placed orders for 85 aircraft in 1930 and 45 in 1932, this latter batch having a more powerful engine fitted. Two high-altitude reconnaissance versions were also built as the Breguet 33, but these did not lead to further production.

Operational history
Breguet 27s continued in military service through the outbreak of World War II, still equipping three Groupes at the time of the initial German offensive. After they began suffering combat losses, the Army withdrew all remaining examples from service.

The two Breguet 33 high-altitude reconnaissance prototypes were used to make significant long-distance flights. The first aircraft was flown from Paris to Hanoi in January 1932 by Paul Codos and Henri Robida in 7 days, 9 hours and 50 minutes, and back again in just 3 days 4 hours and 17 minutes. The second aircraft (christened Joé III) was flown by Maryse Hilsz on a tour of Asia, visiting Calcutta, Saigon, Hanoi, and Tokyo before returning to Paris via Saigon, eventually covering around 35,000 km (22,000 mi). Hilsz also won the 1936 Coupe Héléne Boucher flying a Breguet 27 at an average speed of 277 km/h (172 mph).

The French army ordered 85 270s in 1930. In 1932, 45 Breguet 271s, with a more powerful 484 kW (650 hp) engine, and larger useful load were ordered. Older 270s were modified for VIP liaison duties.

Variants
Breguet 27S
A single Bre.27S was constructed, modified from the Bre.330 No.2, powered by a single Hispano-Suiza 12Nb engine.

Bre.270
Prototypes (ten built) and initial production version (143 built) powered by a single Hispano-Suiza 12Hb engine.

Bre.271
Version powered by the Hispano-Suiza 12Y engine, 45 built.

Bre.272
Version powered by the Gnome-Rhône 9Kdrs engine, two built.

Bre.272TOE
(Théatres des Operations Extérieures) Version optimised for harsh colonial conditions with Renault 9Fas radial engine, 1 built.

Bre.273
Reconnaissance-bomber variant for export, powered by a Hispano-Suiza 12Ybrs engine, 13 built and one converted from a Bre 270. Ten more were built for China powered by Hispano-Suiza 12Ydrs engines, with three also being modified from Hispano-Suiza 12Ybrs powered versions.

Bre.274
Version powered by the Gnome-Rhône 14Kdrs engine, raced by Maryse Hilsz in 1936, one built.

Bre.330
High-altitude version of Breguet 27 with Hispano-Suiza 12Nb engine, one later redesignated Bre.27S, two built.

Bre.330.01
Second Bre.330 prototype optimised for long-duration flight.

Operators

Brazilian Air Force received small batch of Bre.270 aircraft.

Chinese Nationalist Air Force received six Bre.273 aircraft.
Armée de l'Air received 85 Bre.270 designated Bre.270A.2 and 45 Bre.271 designated Bre.271A.2'''.

Venezuelan Air Force operated three Bre.270 aircraft and 15 Bre.273 aircraft.

Specifications (Bre.270A.2)

See also

References

Notes

Bibliography

External links
[Aviafrance.com Breguet]

1920s French military reconnaissance aircraft
Single-engined tractor aircraft
Sesquiplanes
French patrol aircraft
 0270
Aircraft first flown in 1929